Prashant Choudhary  (born 05 October 1994), is an Indian professional footballer who plays as an Defender for I-League club Rajasthan United.

Career statistics

Club

References

Living people
Indian footballers
I-League 2nd Division players
I-League players
Footballers from Rajasthan
Association football defenders
1993 births
Rajasthan United FC players